The Ministry of Religious Affairs and Culture (abbreviated MORAC) administers the religious affairs, cultural affairs and historical and archaeology research efforts of Myanmar (formerly Burma). The Department of Religious Affairs purification, perpetuation, promotion and propagation of the Theravada Buddhist Sasana and promotes Myanmar traditional customs and culture.

History

The Ministry of Culture was established on 16 March 1952 as the Ministry of Union Cultures, and later renamed the Ministry of Culture on 15 March 1972.

The Ministry of Religious Affairs (MORA) came into being before the Union of Burma (now known as the Republic of the Union of Myanmar) regained its Independence in 1947. On 2 March 1962, the Revolutionary Council government reorganised all ministries. The Ministry of Religious Affairs became a department of the Ministry of Home and Religious Affairs. On 18 September 1988. the State Law and Order Restoration Council (SLORC) formed the Department for the Promotion and Propagation of the Sasana, also under the Ministry of Home and Religious Affairs. On 20 March 1992. the ministries of Home Affairs and Religious Affairs were separated. A cabinet meeting on 26 June 1998 confirmed that the International Theravada Buddhist Missionary University would be formed under MORA. MORA's motto was a Pali phrase "Buddha sāsanaṃ ciraṃ tiṭṭhatu", which translates as "Long Live the Buddhist Sasana."

On 1 April 2016, the Ministry of Religious Affairs and Ministry of Culture were combined to form the Ministry of Religious Affairs and Culture, as part of a government downsizing.

Departments
Union Minister Office 
Department of Religious Affairs
 To ensure that all people living in the Union of Myanmar can freely believe in any religion and freely practice that religion.
 Since the great majority of the people are Buddhist, to purify, perpetuate and propagate the three kinds of Sasana of the Buddha namely, Pariyatti, Patipatti and Pativedha.
 To preserve and promote the traditional and cultural heritage of Myanmar.
Department for Promotion and Propagation of Sasana - Responsible for supporting missionary activity within Myanmar and abroad. It also undertakes translation of Pitakas and compilation of Buddhist Treatises
State Pariyatti Sasana University, Yangon
State Pariyatti Sasana University, Mandalay
International Theravada Buddhist Missionary University
Department of Archaeology and National Museum  
Fine Arts Department 
Department of Historical Research and National Library
National University of Arts and Culture, Yangon 
National University of Arts and Culture, Mandalay

Ministers

See also 
 Agga Maha Pandita
 List of Sāsana Azani recipients
 State Sangha Maha Nayaka Committee
 International Theravada Buddhist Missionary University
 State Pariyatti Sasana University, Yangon
 State Pariyatti Sasana University, Mandalay
 Culture of Burma
 Cabinet of Myanmar
 National University of Arts and Culture, Mandalay
 National University of Arts and Culture, Yangon

References

External links

ReligiousAffairsCulture
Myanmar
Myanmar
Religion in Myanmar
1952 establishments in Burma
Ministries established in 2016